The Kings Arms is a pub lying by the River Ouse in the city centre of York, in England.

The building lies across King's Staith from the River Ouse, on its corner with King Street. The building is the only surviving building to form part of First Water Lane, a medieval street that was demolished in a slum clearance program in 1852 and was rebuilt as King Street. A road sign on the building reads; "King Street (formerly Kergate)", as a tribute to the original medieval name of First Water Lane.

It was built in the early-17th century, with the upper floor and north and east walls timber framed. The south and west walls are particularly thick, to provide some protection against flooding, and constructed of brick and stone, some of which is reused from Mediaeval buildings. The building originally had no fireplaces or internal walls, and so is believed to have been constructed as a warehouse or custom house from trade coming up the river.

The building was recorded as the "Kings Arms" pub by 1795, but in 1867 it was renamed as the "Ouse Bridge Inn", for the nearby Ouse Bridge. By 1898, it was owned by the Samuel Smith Old Brewery. They renovated it with new doors and windows, and the rear wing by King Street appears to have been completely rebuilt, the north and east walls rebuilt in brick. In 1973, the pub was again renovated, and the "Kings Arms" name was reinstated. In 1983, the pub was Grade II listed.

The pub floods, on average, four times a year, and does not hold flood insurance. Historically, it would remain open for regulars even when flooded, but this is no longer permitted, as the river water may be contaminated. In 1982, the brewery put a new flood protocol in place. A flood gate is put across the front door, and customers are served in the back bar. Once the flood waters reach the back door, the pub is closed, and all the fixtures and fittings can be dismantled and stored upstairs. The beer and electrics are all upstairs and so are not damaged even by floodwaters 4.5 metres above usual river levels. A chart on the wall marks historic flood heights, the highest being 2000, when floodwater nearly reached the ceiling of the bar.

The pub sign depicts Richard III of England. A legend claims that the bodies of executed criminals were laid out in the building, before being hanged from Ouse Bridge.

References 

Buildings and structures completed in the 1600s
Grade II listed pubs in York